Proctolaelaps is a genus of mites in the family Ascidae.

Species
 Proctolaelaps antennatus Karg, 1985      
 Proctolaelaps arctorotundus Nikolsky, 1984      
 Proctolaelaps aurora (Vitzthum, 1925)      
 Proctolaelaps australis C.Stone, 1988      
 Proctolaelaps basis Karg, 1979      
 Proctolaelaps belemensis Fain, Hyland & Aitken, 1977      
 Proctolaelaps bicaudatus Karg, 1994      
 Proctolaelaps bickleyi (Bram, 1956)      
 Proctolaelaps bloemfonteinensis Hanekom, Loots & Theron, 1988      
 Proctolaelaps certator OConnor, Colwell & Naeem, 1991      
 Proctolaelaps chalybura Dusbabek & Capek, 2007
 Proctolaelaps coffeae Karg, in Karg & Rodriguez 1985      
 Proctolaelaps contactus Karg, 1985      
 Proctolaelaps contentiosus OConnor, Colwell & Naeem, 1991      
 Proctolaelaps cotumex OConnor, Colwell & Naeem, 1991      
 Proctolaelaps cubanus Karg, in Karg & Rodriguez 1985      
 Proctolaelaps de Leoni Mawar, Childers & Abou-Setta, 1991      
 Proctolaelaps debensis Jordaan & Loots, 1987      
 Proctolaelaps diffissus Karg, 1976      
 Proctolaelaps drosophilae Karg, Baker & Jenkinson, 1995      
 Proctolaelaps eccoptogasteris Vitzthum, 1923      
 Proctolaelaps euserratus Karg, 1994      
 Proctolaelaps glaucis Fain, Hyland & Aitken, 1977      
 Proctolaelaps holmi Halliday, 2001      
 Proctolaelaps hystrix (Vitzthum, 1923)      
 Proctolaelaps jurgatus OConnor, Colwell & Naeem, 1991      
 Proctolaelaps kielczewskii Wisniewski, 1980      
 Proctolaelaps lobatus De Leon, 1963      
 Proctolaelaps longichelicerae Ma-Liming, 1996      
 Proctolaelaps longisetosa (Postner, 1951)      
 Proctolaelaps mermillion OConnor, Colwell & Naeem, 1991      
 Proctolaelaps mexicanus Hyland, Fain & Moorhouse, 1978      
 Proctolaelaps micropiloides Karg, 1994      
 Proctolaelaps moseri Wisniewski, 1980      
 Proctolaelaps naskreckii Dusbabek & Halicaek, 2007
 Proctolaelaps nauphoetae (Womersley, 1956)      
 Proctolaelaps nesbitti (Womersley, 1956)      
 Proctolaelaps novineus El-Banhawy & Nasr, 1986      
 Proctolaelaps opilionis Karg, 1994      
 Proctolaelaps orbicularis Karg, 1985      
 Proctolaelaps oribatoides Karg, 1979      
 Proctolaelaps productus Berlese, 1923      
 Proctolaelaps pruni Karg, 1988      
 Proctolaelaps pseudofiseri Nikolsky, 1984      
 Proctolaelaps pygmaeus (J. Müller, 1859)      
 Proctolaelaps rabulatus OConnor, Colwell & Naeem, 1991      
 Proctolaelaps rectangularis Karg, 1985      
 Proctolaelaps reticulatosimilis Bhattacharyya, Sanyal & Bhattacharya, 1998      
 Proctolaelaps roodeplaatensis Hanekom, Loots & Theron, 1988      
 Proctolaelaps slovacus Masan, 1998      
 Proctolaelaps spencerae Domrow, 1979      
 Proctolaelaps spiralis Hyland, Fain & Moorhouse, 1978      
 Proctolaelaps striatus Westerboer, 1963      
 Proctolaelaps threnetes Dusbabek & Literak, 2007
 Proctolaelaps ventrianalis Karg, 1971      
 Proctolaelaps yinchuanensis Bai, Yin & Gu, 1993

References

Ascidae